Pavlo Altukhov (born 23 December 1995) is a Ukrainian canoeist. He competed in the men's C-1 1000 metres event at the 2016 Summer Olympics.

References

External links
 

1995 births
Living people
Ukrainian male canoeists
Olympic canoeists of Ukraine
Canoeists at the 2016 Summer Olympics
Canoeists at the 2020 Summer Olympics
Sportspeople from Khmelnytskyi, Ukraine
21st-century Ukrainian people